Vallonia is a genus of small air-breathing land snails, terrestrial pulmonate gastropod mollusks in the family Valloniidae. 

Vallonia is the type genus of the family Valloniidae.

Species 
Species in the genus Vallonia include:<ref>Forsyth R. G. Terrestrial Gastropods of the Columbia Basin, British Columbia. Family Valloniidae. Accessed 25 April 2009.</ref>
 
 Vallonia asiatica (G. Nevill, 1878)
 † Vallonia berryi Pierce, 1992 
 † Vallonia brochoni (Degrange-Touzin, 1892) 
 † Vallonia chimaira Gerber, 1996 
 Vallonia chinensis K. Suzuki, 1944
 Vallonia costata (O. F. Müller, 1774)
 Vallonia costohimala Gerber & Bössneck, 2009
 Vallonia cyclophorella Sterki, 1892 - silky vallonia
 Vallonia declivis Sterki, 1893  Horsák M., Juřičková L., Beran L., Čejka T. & Dvořák L. (2010). "Komentovaný seznam měkkýšů zjištěných ve volné přírodě České a Slovenské republiky. [Annotated list of mollusc species recorded outdoors in the Czech and Slovak Republics]". Malacologica Bohemoslovaca, Suppl. 1: 1-37. PDF.
 Vallonia eiapopeia Gerber, 1996
 Vallonia enniensis (Gredler, 1856)
 Vallonia excentrica Sterki, 1893 - excentric vallonia
 † Vallonia gigantea Steklov, 1967 
 † Vallonia girauxae (Cossmann, 1902) 
 Vallonia gracilicosta Reinhardt, 1883
 Vallonia himalaevis Gerber & Bössneck, 2009
 † Vallonia hoppla Gerber, 1996 
 Vallonia kamtschatica I. M. Likharev, 1963
 Vallonia kathrinae Gerber & Bössneck, 2009
 † Vallonia kootenayorum Pierce, 2001 
 Vallonia ladacensis (G. Nevill, 1878)
 † Vallonia laxa Gerber, 1996 
 † Vallonia lepida (Reuss, 1849) 
 † Vallonia major Gottschick, 1920 
 Vallonia mionecton (O. Boettger, 1889)
 † Vallonia pallaryi Wenz, 1919 
 Vallonia parvula Sterki, 1893
 Vallonia patens Reinhardt, 1883
 Vallonia persica Rosen, 1892
 Vallonia perspectiva Sterki, 1893 - thin lip vallonia
 Vallonia peteri Schileyko, 1984
 Vallonia pulchella (O. F. Müller, 1774) - lovely vallonia - type species
 Vallonia pulchellula (Heude, 1882)
 Vallonia ranovi Meng & Gerber, 2008
 † Vallonia sandbergeri (Deshayes, 1863) 
 † Vallonia sparnacensis (Deshayes, 1863) 
 † Vallonia stworzewiczae Neubauer, 2013 
 † Vallonia subcyclophorella (Gottschick, 1911) 
 Vallonia suevica Geyer, 1908
 Vallonia tenuilabris (Braun, 1843)
 Vallonia terraenovae Gerber, 1996
 Vallonia tokunagai K. Suzuki, 1944
 † Vallonia tumida Stworzewicz, 2007 
 Vallonia zaru Almuhambetova, 1979
 † Vallonia zykini Prysiazhniuk, 2016 †

Synonyms
 Vallonia allamanica Geyer, 1908: synonym of Vallonia suevica Geyer, 1908 (junior synonym)
 Vallonia albula Sterki, 1893: synonym of Vallonia gracilicosta Reinhardt, 1883
 Vallonia americana Ancey, 1893: synonym of Vallonia parvula Sterki, 1893 (junior subjective synonym)
 Vallonia astoma O. Boettger, 1909: synonym of Gittenbergia sororcula (Benoit, 1859) (junior synonym)
 Vallonia costataeformis Jooss, 1912: synonym of Vallonia costata (O. F. Müller, 1774) (junior subjective synonym)
 Vallonia jurassica Geyer, 1908: synonym of Vallonia costata (O. F. Müller, 1774)
 Vallonia ladakensis (G. Nevill, 1878): synonym of Vallonia ladacensis (G. Nevill, 1878) (unjustified emendation of Vallonia ladacensis (Nevill, 1878))
 Vallonia miserrima Gude, 1907: synonym of Vallonia ladacensis (G. Nevill, 1878) (junior synonym)
 Vallonia miserrina Gude, 1907: synonym of Vallonia miserrima Gude, 1907: synonym of Vallonia ladacensis (G. Nevill, 1878) (incorrect subsequent spelling)
 † Vallonia moguntiaca Wenz, 1915: synonym of † Vallonia lepida (Reuss, 1849)  (unaccepted > junior subjective synonym)
 Vallonia rosalia Risso, 1826: synonym of Vallonia costata (O. F. Müller, 1774)
 Vallonia sonorana Pilsbry, 1915: synonym of Vallonia gracilicosta Reinhardt, 1883
 † Vallonia subpulchella (F. Sandberger, 1872): synonym of † Vallonia lepida (Reuss, 1849) (junior subjective synonym)
 Vallonia tenera (Reinhardt, 1877): synonym of Vallonia pulchellula (Heude, 1882) (junior synonym)

 References 

 Schileyko, A. A. (1984). Nazemnye molljuski podotrjada Pupillina fauny SSSR (Gastropoda, Pulmonata, Geophila). In:. Fauna SSSR, Molljuski. III, 3 
 Pfeffer, G. (1930). Zur Kenntnis tertiärer Landschnecken. Geologisch-Paläontologische Abhandlungen, neue Folge. 17(3): 153-380, pl. 15-17.
 Schileyko, A. A. (1998). Treatise on Recent terrestrial pulmonate molluscs. Part 1. Achatinellidae, Amastridae, Orculidae, Strobilopsidae, Spelaeodiscidae, Valloniidae, Cochlicopidae, Pupillidae, Chondrinidae, Pyramidellidae. Ruthenica. Supplement 2: 1-127. Moskva

 Further reading 
  Gerber J. (1996). "Revision der Gattung Vallonia Risso, 1826 (Mollusca: Gastropoda: Valloniidae)". Schriften zur Malakozoologie'' 8: 1-227.

External links
 Brown, T. (1827). Illustrations of the conchology of Great Britain and Ireland. Drawn from nature. W.H. Lizars and D. Lizars, Edinburgh and S. Highley, London. 144 pp., 52 pls.
 Turton, W. (1831). A manual of the land and fresh-water shells of the British Islands, arranged according to the more modern system of classification; and described from perfect specimens in the author's cabinet: with coloured plates of every species, viii + 152 + 16 pp.): Index of English names), 9 unnumbered plates. London (Longman, Rees, Orme, Brown, & Green).
 Albers, J. C. (1850). Die Heliceen nach natürlicher Verwandtschaft systematisch geordnet. Berlin: Enslin. 262 pp
 Beck, H. H. (1838). Species novarum in indice molluscorum praesentis aevi musei Principis Christiani Frederici ab autore propositarum characteres breves. Hafniae (= København): 1-8.
  Caziot, E. (1910). Étude sur les mollusques terrestres et fluviatiles de la Principauté de Monaco et du Département des Alpes-Maritimes. 559

Valloniidae
Taxonomy articles created by Polbot